Walk on Fire is the second studio album from Belfast New Wave/rock band Silent Running, released in 1987.

Background
After the commercial failure of the band's 1984 debut album Shades of Liberty and its three singles, the band were to record their second album for EMI Records. However, the 1985 single "No Faith is Blind" failed to become a commercial success. Despite massive airplay and appearances on television shows across the musical spectrum (including 'Cheggar's Plays Pop') the single resulted in the band being dropped by EMI.

In a major coup the band were picked up by Atlantic Records, becoming the first British or Irish act to join the roster of this legendary American record label.

A total of two singles were released from the album; "Sanctuary" and "Heartland", which both failed to make enough impact to chart, causing the band to not make the elusive breakthrough that was hoped.

"Sanctuary" was released in both the UK and America. The artwork for the single used the main artwork for the album. "Heartland" was released during 1988 in the UK only although it was also released as an American promotional single. The single featured non-related artwork to the album.

Following the commercial failure of the album, the band would work on their next album for Atlantic Records, the 1989 album Deep.

Recording
The album was produced and engineered by British-Canadian producer Terry Brown, although two tracks, "Walk on Fire" and "Till Tomorrow Comes", were produced by Andy Richards and engineered by Tony Phillips. All tracks are original, where the music was written by all four members of the band, with the lyrics being written solely by vocalist Peter Gamble.

Keyboardist Alex White left in 1985 to work with Joan Armatrading, resulting in the band relying on session musicians such as Ian Curnow (Talk Talk) to record keyboards on the album.

Release
Walk on Fire was released by Atlantic Records in North America, Europe and Australia. The album was made available on all streaming platforms by Warner Music on 23 July 2021.

Promotion
A music video was created for the single "Sanctuary".

A European mini-poster advertisement for the album was issued for magazines.

Track listing

Critical reception

Personnel

Silent Running
 Peter Gamble - vocals, lyrics
 Tony Scott - guitar
 Richard Collett - bass
 Ian Gault - drums, drum programming

Additional personnel
 Terry Brown - Producer, Engineer
 Andy Richards - Producer on "Walk on Fire" and "Till Tomorrow Comes", Keyboards
 Tony Phillips - Engineer on "Walk on Fire" and "Till Tomorrow Comes"
 James Reynolds - Assistant Engineer
 Ren Swan - Assistant Engineer
 Trevor Hallesy - Engineer
 Ian Curnow - Keyboards
 Clive Griffin, Helena Spriggs, Linda Taylor, Shirley Lewis, Tessa Niles - Backing Vocals

References

1987 albums
Silent Running (band) albums
Albums produced by Terry Brown (record producer)
Atlantic Records albums